Rhytisma vitis is a species of fungus in the family Rhytismataceae. It was described by Lewis David de Schweinitz in 1832.

References 

Fungi described in 1832
Fungal plant pathogens and diseases
Leotiomycetes